The Ottoman Turkish alphabet is a version of the Arabic script used to write Ottoman Turkish until 1928, when it was replaced by the Latin-based modern Turkish alphabet.

Though Ottoman Turkish was primarily written in this script, non-Muslim Ottoman subjects sometimes wrote it in other scripts, including the Armenian, Greek, Latin and Hebrew alphabets.

History

Origins
The various Turkic languages have been written in a number of different alphabets, including Cyrillic, Arabic, Greek, Latin and other writing systems.

The earliest known Turkic alphabet is the Orkhon script. When Turks adopted Islam, they began to use Arabic script for their languages, especially under the Kara-Khanids. Though the Seljuks used Persian as their official language, in the late Seljuk period, Turkish began to be written again in Anatolia in the nascent Ottoman state.

The Ottoman Turkish alphabet is a form of the Perso-Arabic script that, despite not being able to differentiate O and U, was otherwise generally better suited to writing Turkic words rather than Perso-Arabic words. Turkic words had all of their vowels written in and had systematic spelling rules and seldom needed to be memorized. Other Oghuz Turkic languages such as Azerbaijani and Turkmen enjoyed a high degree of written mutual intelligibility as the Ottoman Alphabet catered to anachronistic Turkic consonants and spellings that demonstrated Anatolian Turkish' shared history with Azerbaijani and Turkmen. The Ottoman Turkish alphabet however was poorly suited to  Arabic and Persian loanwords which needed to be memorized by students learning Turkish as it would omit vowels making them difficult to read. Arabic  has several consonants that do not exist in Turkish, making several Arabic letters superfluous.   

The introduction of the telegraph and the printing press in the 19th century exposed further weaknesses in the Arabic script.

Some Turkish reformers promoted the Latin script well before Atatürk's reforms. In 1862, during an earlier period of reform, the statesman Münif Pasha advocated a reform of the alphabet. At the start of the 20th century, similar proposals were made by several writers associated with the Young Turk movement, including Hüseyin Cahit, Abdullah Cevdet and Celâl Nuri. In 1917, Enver Pasha introduced a revised alphabet, the  representing Turkish sounds more accurately; it was based on Arabic letter forms, but written separately, not joined cursively. It was for a time the official script of the Army.

The romanization issue was raised again in 1923 during the İzmir Economic Congress of the new Turkish Republic, sparking a public debate that was to continue for several years. A move away from the Arabic script was strongly opposed by conservative and religious elements. It was argued that romanization of the script would detach Turkey from the wider Islamic world, substituting a foreign (European) concept of national identity for the confessional community.

Others opposed romanization on practical grounds, as there was no suitable adaptation of the Latin script that could be used for Turkish phonemes. Some suggested that a better alternative might be to modify the Arabic script to introduce extra characters for better representing Turkish vowels.

In 1926, the Turkic republics of the Soviet Union adopted the Latin script, giving a major boost to reformers in Turkey.

Replacement

Ottoman Turkish script was replaced by the Latin-based new Turkish alphabet. Its use became compulsory in all public communications in 1929.  The change was formalized by the Law on the Adoption and Implementation of the Turkish Alphabet, passed on November 1, 1928, and effective on January 1, 1929.

Alphabet 
As with Arabic, Persian and Urdu, texts in the Ottoman Turkish alphabet are written right to left. The appearance of a letter changes depending on its position in a word: 
 isolated (in a one-letter word); 
 final (in which case it is joined on the right to the preceding letter); 
 medial (joined on both sides); and 
 initial (joined on the left to the following letter).

Some letters cannot be joined to the left and so do not possess separate medial and initial forms. In medial position, the final form is used. In initial position, the isolated form is used.

Notes 
In general, /g/ and /ŋ/ sounds are represented by kef ك. The letter ڭ (kef with three dots above) also appears to be denoting the sound /g/ in Early Ottoman Turkish manuscripts, also known as kef-i Farisi ("Persian kef").
Persian and Ottoman use the order vāv, he, ye, though in Arabic, they are he, vāv, ye.
One further sign, which is not considered an actual letter, is the so-called te merbūṭa ('connected t'), which can indicate the Arabic feminine singular ending and which is often also written in Ottoman texts. Te merbūṭa is always at the end

Sound–letter correspondence 
The orthography of Ottoman Turkish is complex, as many Turkish sounds can be written with several different letters. Conversely, some letters have more than one value:  k may be /k/, /ɡ/, /n/, /j/, or /ː/ (lengthening the preceding vowel; modern ğ), and vowels are written ambiguously or not at all. For example, the text  kwrk can be read as /ɟevɾec/ 'biscuit', /cyɾc/ 'fur', /cyɾec/ 'shovel', /cøryc/ 'bellows', /ɟørek/ 'view', which in modern orthography are written gevrek, kürk, kürek, körük, görek.

The Persian consonant (ژ) is not native to Turkish but is still pronounced distinctively with the letter J in the modern Turkish Latin Alphabet. Turkish has 8 total vowels which are evenly split between front and back vowels. One of the shortcommings of the Ottoman Turkish alphabet is that it could not differentiate between the front and back vowels with the exception of A and E. This situation required readers to inferr the frontness or backness of vowels based on consonants and the vowels A and E. Another shortcoming was that it could not differentiate between O/Ö and U/Ü in the first syllable (O/Ö do not exist in the second syllable in Turkic, Arabic, or Persian words with the exception of one suffix -iyor/ıyor). Although this issue only existed in the first syllable, the O/Ö sounds were generally more common than U/Ü in the first syllable.

Arabic and Persian borrowings are written in their original orthography: for example, and if using Arabic vowel points (harakat), sabit 'firm' is written as  s̱âbit, with  s̱ representing /s/ (in Arabic /θ/),  representing the long vowel /aː/ as in Arabic,  representing /b/,  representing the short vowel /i/, and  representing /t/. However, as in Arabic and Persian, harakat are generally found only in dictionaries and didactic works, therefore the same word sabit will generally be found written thus:  (with no indication of the short /i/). As in Persian, the alif hamza ( ’) is rarely used in initial position and is replaced instead by a plain alif; the ta marbuta (appearing in final position of Arabic words) is also rarely used. The letters ث ح ذ ض ظ ع are found only in borrowings from Arabic; ژ is only in borrowings from Persian and French.

Consonant letters are classified in three series, based on vowel harmony: soft, hard, and neutral. The soft consonant letters, ت س ك گ ه, are found in front vowel (e, i, ö, ü) contexts; the hard, ح خ ص ض ط ظ ع غ ق, in back vowel (a, ı, o, u) contexts; and the neutral, ب پ ث ج چ د ذ ر ز ژ ش ف ل م ن, in either. In Perso-Arabic borrowings, the vowel used in Turkish depends on the softness of the consonant. Thus,  klb 'dog' (Arabic /kalb/) is /kelb/, while  ḳlb 'heart' (Arabic /qalb/) is /kalb/. Conversely, in Turkish words, the choice of consonant reflects the native vowel.

(All other sounds are only written with neutral consonant letters.)

In Turkish words, vowels are sometimes written using the vowel letters as the second letter of a syllable: elif  for /a/; ye  for /i/, /ɯ/; vav  for /o/, /œ/, /u/, /y/; he  for /a/, /e/. The corresponding harakat are there: üstün  (Arabic fatḥah) for /a/, /e/; esre  (Arabic kasrah) for /ɯ/, /i/; ötre  (Arabic ḍammah) for /o/, /œ/, /u/, /y/. The names of the harakat are also used for the corresponding vowels.

Other scripts
Other scripts were sometimes used by non-Muslims to write Ottoman Turkish since the Arabic alphabet was identified with Islam.

The first novel to be written in the Ottoman Empire was Akabi (1851), which was written in the Armenian script by Vartan Pasha. Similarly, when the Armenian Duzian family managed the Ottoman mint during the reign of Sultan Abdülmecid I ( 1839–61), they kept records in Ottoman Turkish but used the Armenian script.

The Greek alphabet and the Rashi script of Hebrew were used by Greeks, Orthodox Turks and Jews for Ottoman. Greek-speaking Muslims would write Greek using the Ottoman Turkish script. Karamanlides (Orthodox Turks in Central Anatolia around Karaman region ) used Greek letters for Ottoman Turkish.

Numerals 
Ottoman Turkish used Eastern Arabic numerals. The following is the list of basic cardinal numerals with the spelling in the modern Turkish alphabet:

References

External links 
 Simon Ager, Turkish alphabet, Omniglot

Arabic alphabets
Persian alphabets
Ottoman culture
Turkish language
Alphabets used by Turkic languages

de:Osmanische Sprache#Verschriftlichung